Sérgio Dias Baptista (born December 1, 1950) is a Brazilian rock musician, composer and guitar player.   Twice a Latin Grammy nominee, he is best known for his work with the band Os Mutantes and has been the only consistent member of the band, appearing on every album since its formation. In 2010 Sergio Dias collaborated  with the band Tahiti Boy and the Palmtree Family in a project called "We are the Lilies", which also featured contributions from Iggy Pop and Jane Birkin.

Discography 

With Os Mutantes

Solo, soundtrack and collaborations
 1980: Sérgio Dias, CBS (Brazil)
 1988: Johnny Love - OST, SBK (Brazil)
 1990: Mato Grosso (with Phil Manzanera), Expression Records (UK)
 1991: Mind Over Matter, Expression Records (UK)
 1997: Song of the Leopard, Black Sun Records (USA)
 2000: Estação da Luz, Lotus Music (Brazil)
 2003: Jazz Mania Live (recorded in 1986), Editio Princeps (Brazil)
 2011: We Are The Lilies (with Tahiti Boy & The Palmtree Family), Third Side Records, (UK)

See also
 Tropicália

External links
 Documentary about Sérgio Dias collaboration with Tahiti Boy in 2010
 Guitarra de Ouro - Golden Guitar

References 

1951 births
Living people
20th-century Brazilian male singers
20th-century Brazilian singers
Brazilian male guitarists
Brazilian rock musicians
21st-century Brazilian male singers
21st-century Brazilian singers
Musicians from São Paulo
Os Mutantes members